HMS Gloucester was a 60-gun fourth rate ship of the line of the Royal Navy, built at Rotherhithe according to the 1706 Establishment, and launched on 25 July 1709.

Gloucester's career with the Royal Navy was brief, for on 26 October 1709, she was captured by French forces off Cape Clear Island.

Notes

References

Lavery, Brian (2003) The Ship of the Line - Volume 1: The development of the battlefleet 1650-1850. Conway Maritime Press. .
Michael Phillips. Gloucester (60) (1709). Michael Phillips' Ships of the Old Navy. Retrieved 30 July 2008.

Ships of the line of the Royal Navy
1700s ships